Charles Everett may refer to:

 Charles Carroll Everett (1829–1900), American divine and philosopher
 Charles Everett (cricketer) (1835–1896), English cricketer
 Charles Arthur Everett (1828–1909), merchant and political figure in New Brunswick, Canada
 Charles H. Everett (1855–1947), American politician
 C. Douglas Everett (1902–1982), insurance agent and political figure in New Brunswick, Canada